In its over 160-year history, the Sydney Law School has produced a prominent group of alumni. The following is a list of some of these prominent alumni.

Courts and tribunals

International Court of Justice 
 Sir Percy Spender: International Court of Justice judge 1958–1964, President 1964–1967
 Sir Garfield Barwick ad hoc judge 1973–1974

High Court of Australia 
 Chief Justices of the High Court of Australia (in chronological order):
 Sir Garfield Barwick
 Sir Anthony Mason
 Murray Gleeson
 Puisne Justices of the High Court (in chronological order):
 Sir George Rich
 H. V. Evatt
 Sir Edward McTiernan
 Sir Dudley Williams
 Sir Frank Kitto
 Sir Alan Taylor
 Sir Victor Windeyer
 Sir Cyril Walsh
 Sir Kenneth Jacobs
 Lionel Murphy
 Sir William Deane
 Mary Gaudron
 Michael Kirby
 William Gummow
 Dyson Heydon
 Susan Crennan
 Virginia Bell
 Jacqueline Gleeson
 Jayne Jagot
As of 2017, Sydney Law School has produced 18 out of 52 Justices of the High Court of Australia (with the University of Sydney more broadly having produced 24).

Supreme Court of New South Wales 
Chief Justices of the NSW Supreme Court:
 Tom Bathurst (2011–)
 James Spigelman (1998–2011)
 Murray Gleeson (1988–1998)
 Sir Laurence Whistler Street (1974–1988)
 Sir John Kerr (1972–1974)
 Sir Leslie James Herron (1962–1972)
 Dr. H. V. Evatt (1960–1962)
 Sir Kenneth Whistler Street (1950–1960)
 Sir Frederick Richard Jordan (1934–1949)
 Sir Philip Whistler Street (1925–1934)
 Sir William Portus Cullen (1910–1925)
Presidents of the NSW Court of Appeal
 Andrew Bell (2019-)
 Margaret Beazley (2013–2019)
 James Allsop (2008–2013)
 Keith Mason (1997-2008)
 Dennis Mahoney (1996-1997)
 Michael Kirby (1984-1996)
 Athol Moffitt (1974-1984)
 Sir Kenneth Jacobs (1972–1974)
 Sir Bernard Sugerman (1970-1972)
 Sir Gordon Wallace, first President of the Court of Appeal (1966–1970)
Judges of the NSW Court of Appeal:
 Paul Brereton (2018-)
 Richard White (2017-)
 Anthony Payne (2016-)
 Carolyn Simpson (2015–2018); Acting Judge of Appeal (2018-)
 Mark Leeming (2013–)
 Fabian Gleeson (2013-)
 Arthur Emmett (2013–2015); Acting Judge of Appeal (2015-)
 Peter McClellan (2013–2018)
 Julie Ward (2012–); Chief Judge in Equity (2017-)
 Clifton Hoeben  (2012–); Chief Judge at Common Law (2013-)
 Reginald Barrett (2012-2015); Acting Judge of Appeal (2016-2020)
 Peter Young AO (2009–2012)
 Robert Macfarlan (2008–)
 Joseph Campbell (2007-2012)
 Ruth McColl AO (2003–2019)
 Kim Santow (2002–2007)
In 1999 legal history was made when Justices Virginia Bell, Margaret Beazley and Carolyn Simpson sat together, forming the first all-female bench in an Australian court. According to the Women Lawyers Association of NSW, there had never been an all-female bench in England or New Zealand.

Judges of the NSW Supreme Court:
 Julia Lonergan (2017-)
 Natalie Adams (2016-)
 Helen Wilson (2014-)
 John Sackar (2011-)
 Peter Garling (2010–)
 Clifton Hoeben (2004–2012)
 Carolyn Simpson (1994–2015)
 Kim Santow (1993–2002)
 Peter Young AO (1985–2001)

Federal Court of Australia 
 Nigel Bowen, First Chief Justice of the Federal Court of Australia (1976-1990)
 Marcus Einfeld (1986–2001)
 Arthur Emmett (1997–2013)
 Peter Jacobson (2002-2015)
 Steven Rares (2006-)
 Geoffrey Flick (2007-)
 Lindsay Foster (2008-2020)
 Jayne Jagot (2008-)
 Nye Perram (2008-)
 David Yates (2009-)
 Kathleen Farrell (2012-)
 James Allsop, Chief Justice of the Federal Court of Australia (2013–)
 Michael Wigney (2013-)
 Jacqueline Gleeson (2014-)
 Stephen Burley (2016-)
 Michael Lee (2017-)

Supreme Court of Tasmania 
 Alan Blow  (Justice 2000–2013; Chief Justice 2013–)

Supreme Court of Western Australia 
 Graeme Murphy (3 August 2010)

Solicitors-General of Australia 
 Sir Robert Garran (1916–1932)
 Sir Anthony Mason (1964–1969)
 Bob Ellicott (1969–1973)
 Sir Maurice Byers (1973–1983)
 David Bennett (1998–2008)
 Justin Gleeson (2013–2016)

Other legal professionals 
 Marie Beuzeville Byles, the first woman to practise as a lawyer in NSW
 Nicholas Cowdery QC, former NSW Director of Public Prosecutions (1994–2011)
 Ada Emily Evans, the first woman in Australia to graduate with an LL.B. (but not permitted to practise)
 Elizabeth Evatt, former Chief Justice of the Family Court of Australia and first Australian to be appointed to the United Nations Human Rights Committee
 Barbara Holborow, magistrate in the New South Wales Children's Court
 Kate O'Regan, Justice of the Constitutional Court of South Africa from 1994 to 2009
 Geoffrey Robertson QC, former President of the Special Court for Sierra Leone, human rights lawyer, author and joint head of Doughty Street Chambers
 Kim Santow, Justice of Appeal in the New South Wales Supreme Court and former Chancellor of the University of Sydney (2001–2007)
 Mark Tedeschi QC, Senior Crown Prosecutor for New South Wales
 Lucy Turnbull, lawyer and former Lord Mayor of Sydney
 Bret Walker SC, leading silk and former President of the Law Council of Australia

Politics 

 President of the United Nations General Assembly:
 Dr. H. V. Evatt (1948–1949)
 Governors-General of Australia (in chronological order):
 Sir John Kerr
 Sir William Deane
 Prime Ministers of Australia (in chronological order):
 Sir Edmund Barton
 Sir William McMahon
 Gough Whitlam
 John Howard
Tony Abbott
Malcolm Turnbull
 Deputy Prime Minister of Australia
Lionel Bowen
 Federal Opposition Leaders (in chronological order):
 Dr. H. V. Evatt
 John Howard
 Malcolm Turnbull
 Tony Abbott
 Attorneys-General of Australia (in chronological order)
 Dr. H. V. Evatt
 Sir Garfield Barwick
 Sir Nigel Bowen
 Tom Hughes AO QC Legion of Honour
 Lionel Murphy
 Kep Enderby
 Bob Ellicott
 Lionel Bowen
 Philip Ruddock
 Robert McClelland
 Governor of New South Wales
 Margaret Beazley (2019-)
 Premier of New South Wales (in chronological order):
 Sir Thomas Bavin
 Neville Wran
 Premier of Queensland:
 Sir Samuel Griffith
 Ambassadors:
 John McCarthy, Ambassador of Australia to the Holy See
 Joe Hockey, Ambassador of Australia to the United States

Business 
 James Wolfensohn, former President of the World Bank Group
 Rene Rivkin, entrepreneur
 Allan Moss, banker
 John Coates, Vice-President, International Olympic Committee
 David Gallop, Chief Executive, Football Federation Australia

Academia

Academics 
 William Gummow
 Dyson Heydon
 Sarah Joseph
 Andrew Leigh
 Ben Saul

Rhodes scholars 
24 Rhodes scholars including:
 Vincent John Flynn (1927)
 David Hargraves Hodgson (1962)
 Geoffrey Robertson (1970)
 Malcolm Turnbull (1978)
 Tony Abbott (1981)

Vinerian Scholars 
 Peter Cane (1976), Magdalen College, Oxford
 Andrew Bell SC (1993), Magdalen College, Oxford
 Naomi Oreb (2012), Magdalen College, Oxford
 Luca Moretti (2019), Christ Church, Oxford 
 Alyssa Glass (2020), Magdalen College, Oxford

Arts, media, and entertainment 
 Richard Ackland, journalist and publisher
 Janet Albrechtsen, columnist
Alex Cubis, actor
 Julia Leigh, writer and film director
 Chas Licciardello, comedian
 David Marr, writer
 Julian Morrow, comedian
 Andrew O'Keefe, entertainer
 Craig Reucassel, comedian
 Peter Weir, film director

Sport 
 Nick Farr-Jones, former Wallabies captain

References